Alan W. Bock (December 3, 1943 – May 18, 2011) was an American libertarian author. He was a senior editorial writer and former editorial page editor for the Orange County Register for over 25 years.  He wrote regular columns for WorldNetDaily, LewRockwell.com, and Antiwar.com and was a contributing editor at Liberty magazine. He had also been published in The American Conservative.

Career
Bock was also an active public speaker having experience in radio and television. He spoke at such forums as the Cato Institute, Reason Foundation, the Drug Policy Foundation, American Enterprise Institute, Freedom Summit, the Liberty Editors' Conference and the Festival of Freedom. In the 1970s, Bock spent eight years in Washington, D.C., where he worked for two different congressmen. He then formed a libertarian lobbying organization called Libertarian Advocate. He also spent some time working as a radio talk-show host where he appeared on CNN, Fox News, MSNBC, PBS, and countless others. He contributed to Reason, Freeman, National Review, and Harvard Business Review.

Education
Bock attended the University of California, Los Angeles on a National Merit scholarship.

Political views
Bock had been critical of both parties for their support of an aggressive foreign policy. He had also been critical of imperialism and nation-building, and believed that "the U.S. empire is in the process of winding down."

Death
Bock died on May 18, 2011 after entering hospice due to cancer.  He was 67 and was living in Lake Elsinore, California.

Publications
He was the author of four books:
 The Ecology Action Guide (1971) , 
 I Saw the Light: The Gospel Life of Hank Williams (1977) 
 Ambush at Ruby Ridge: How Government Agents Set Randy Weaver Up and Took His Family Down (1995) , 
 Waiting to Inhale: the Politics of Medical Marijuana (2000) ,

References

External links
 Bio at OCRegister.com
 Bio from the Advocates for Self-Government
 Alan Bock columns at Antiwar.com
 Alan Bock's Official Website AlanBock.com
 
 

1943 births
2011 deaths
20th-century American male writers
20th-century American non-fiction writers
21st-century American male writers
21st-century American non-fiction writers
American anti-war activists
American columnists
American male journalists
American male non-fiction writers
American political journalists
American political scientists
American political writers
American radio hosts
California Libertarians
Deaths from cancer in California
Journalists from California
Non-interventionism
American opinion journalists
People from Lake Elsinore, California
University of California, Los Angeles alumni
Writers from California
Place of birth missing